Langeac is a commune in the Haute-Loire department in south-central France. It is located about 30 km west of Le Puy-en-Velay, and about 100 km southwest of Lyon.

Population

See also
 Communes of the Haute-Loire department

References

Communes of Haute-Loire
Auvergne